The 151st Infantry Regiment is an infantry unit in the Indiana National Guard, part of the 76th Infantry Brigade Combat Team (Separate).

History
The 151st Infantry Regiment traces its roots to the Indiana Territory Indiana Rangers militia. It was in the 1811 Battle of Tippecanoe that it earned its motto "Wide Awake! Wide Awake!" In 1846, the 2d Regiment, Indiana Volunteers, Indiana Brigade was mustered into Federal Service for the Mexican–American War, and was again federalized in 1861 during the American Civil War. It was reorganized in 1882 into the Indiana Legion, which was renamed the Indiana National Guard 5 March 1895. The 151st Infantry Regiment is credited with 24 campaigns from the Civil War due to lineage traced to the 7th, 10th, and 11th Indiana Volunteer Infantry Regiments.

The Regiment was again federalized in 1898 for service in the Spanish–American War. In 1900, it was reorganized as the First Infantry, Indiana National Guard. The First Infantry was mustered into federal service at Fort Benjamin Harrison in 1916 for service in the Mexican Border Campaign.

With the outbreak of World War I, the First Infantry was reorganized into the 151st Infantry Regiment, and assigned to the 76th Infantry Brigade, 38th Division. The division was mobilized for Federal service in 1917 and demobilized in 1919. The division was again activated in 1941 in preparation for World War II. In the South Pacific, the 151st Regiment earned three battle streamers (New Guinea, Leyte and Luzon) helping the 38th Infantry Division win the nickname "Avengers of Bataan."

 Elements of the 151st Regiment served in the Vietnam War.  Company D (Ranger), "Delta Company," was the only National Guard Infantry unit to serve intact, and earned more medals in 1969 than any other Army infantry company during a 1-year period, and has been credited with reintegrating National Guard units with the United States Army after they were intentionally separated during the Vietnam War. The company was eventually assigned to II Field Force Vietnam with the mission of conducting long range patrols in War Zone D, in the III Corps Tactical Zone. After the company's arrival, the 199th Infantry Brigade (Light) oversaw its initial administration and support.

In 1977, the regiment was organized into two battalions, elements of the 38th Infantry Division. Both the 1st Battalion (1-151 IN) and 2nd Battalion (2-151 IN) are elements of the 76th Infantry Brigade Combat Team (Separate), Elements of the 151st have deployed to Bosnia (NATO SFOR), Iraq Operation Iraqi Freedom and Afghanistan Operation Enduring Freedom. During deployment to Afghanistan in 2009-2010, Bravo company of 2nd Bn, 151st Inf received both the Meritorious Unit Citation and the Valorous Unit Award while attached to Task Force Yukon (4th IBCT (Airborne)) and Task Force Rakkasan (3d Bde, 101st Airborne Division), as a part of Regional Command East, International Security Assistance Force (ISAF) conducting counterinsurgency operations in Khost province. The two battalions reunited in 2011 to commemorate the 200th anniversary of the Battle of Tippecanoe.

References

Notes

External links

 
 
 
 http://www.armyhistory.org/company-d-151st-infantry-the-indiana-rangers-vietnam/

Infantry regiments of the United States Army National Guard
Military units and formations in Indiana
151
Military units and formations established in 1817